Ronald Kenneth Westray, Jr. (born June 13, 1970 in Columbia, South Carolina) is an American jazz trombonist, composer, and educator. He holds a B.A. from South Carolina State University and a Master of Arts degree from Eastern Illinois University.  He has played with Marcus Roberts, the Lincoln Center Jazz Orchestra (since its inception in 1993), and has been a regular member of the Mingus Big Band. In 2005 he joined the faculty of the University of Texas at Austin.  In 2009 he was appointed to the Oscar Peterson Chair in Jazz Performance at York University.

Discography
 Westray Digs In (New Jazz Renaissance, 2002)
 Medical Cures for the Chromatic Commands of the Inner City (Blue Canoe, 2008)
 Ron Westray/Thomas Heflin Live from Austin (Blue Canoe, 2011)
 Jimi Jazz (Blue Canoe, 2014)
 Magisteria (Blue Canoe, 2015)

As sideman
With Wycliffe Gordon
 Bone Structure (Atlantic, 1996)

References

External links

Ron Westray, Oscar Peterson Chair in Jazz Performance, York University

1970 births
American jazz trombonists
Male trombonists
Eastern Illinois University alumni
Living people
South Carolina State University alumni
University of Texas at Austin faculty
21st-century trombonists
21st-century American male musicians
American male jazz musicians